The 2015 IAAF World Relays was the second edition of the biennial, global track and field relay competition between nations. As in the previous year, it was held in May in Nassau, Bahamas. Apart from contesting for the Golden Baton for the best team overall, the competition also served as a qualifying stage for the 2016 Summer Olympics in the 4 × 100 and 4 × 400 metres relay. One major change compared to the inaugural edition was the replacement of the 4 × 1500 metres relay with the distance medley relay.

Schedule

Results

Men

Women

Medal table

Team standings
Teams scored for every place in the top 8 with 8 points awarded for the first place, 7 for second, etc. The overall points winner was given the Golden Baton.

Qualification for 2016 Summer Olympics
The top eight-finishers in 4×100 and 4×400 events gained qualification into the 2016 Olympic Games in Rio de Janeiro. If a team was disqualified, the top team in the B-final would qualify.

The following teams secured a full set of relay places across four events at the 2016 Games:

Participating nations
669 athletes from 43 nations are set to take part in the competition.

 (host)

Records

References

External links
Official website
Official IAAF site

 
World Athletics Relays
World Relays
International athletics competitions hosted by the Bahamas
World Relays
May 2015 sports events in North America